At the World Trade Organization Ministerial Conference of 2003, trade ministers from 146 members of the World Trade Organization, representing 93 percent of global Commerce, convened in Cancun, Mexico, in September 2003. The goal of this meeting was to set a direction for nations among the World Trade Organization to come to agreements and negotiations about agriculture, non agricultural market access, services, and special treatment for developing countries. The negotiations were supposed to be reached by January 1, 2005. Although the agreements had a set date to come to terms, the Cancun Ministerial Conference ended up failing in their mission and did not come to any firm decisions to fix the problem. They failed to make global trade negotiations concrete and founded at that time, so the next steps were uncertain. Although the intentions of this Organization were noble, they were unsuccessful but opportunity was sought after to learn from this failure. Within the committee, there exists a hierarchy within the World Trade Organization. It is made up of trade Administrators that come from all the different sectors of the WTO. The Fifth Ministerial Conference of the World Trade Organization, also known as the WTO Fifth Ministerial Conference and abbreviated as MC5, was held at the Cancún Centro de Convenciones, Cancún, Mexico from September 10 to  September 14, 2003.

Background
The General Agreement on Tariffs and Trade (GATT) was created in 1947 after World War II in an attempt to encourage and regulate a global Free Trade market. This agreement between countries later evolved into the World Trade Organization following the Uruguay Round of 1994, With the goals of lowering Tariffs and taxes worldwide, the committee is designed to voice the opinions and needs of all countries big and small. Of the larger topics that is constantly addressed is an Open Market on crops and food. This committee has helped Developing Countries enter a new era of a worldwide sharing and trading of goods. In Doha, Qatar, in 2001, the World Trade Organization met to discuss the potential of a new focus upon the development and progression of developing countries concerning their free, open markets on top of abolishing certain lingering agreements. These agreements included tariffs, taxes, and agreements concerning trade of goods (specifically food such as grain, corn, and tobacco).

Priorities
During the World Trade Organization meeting in Cancun in 2003, there were numerous topics that drew much attention. From the get go, there was a large rift between developed and under developed countries on how to deal with these. These topics were as follows: nonagricultural market availability and access, agricultural reformation, the addition of new item subjects for World Trade Organization commitments, services (like telecommunications and financial services) and specialized treatment for developing countries. Of all these topics, there were no definite decisions or outcomes that came from the five-day process. It did however progress the ideas forward for the next conference. Many found the ideas were just the start and would provide a good push when the next conference came around

Problems with the meeting
The United States Government Accountability Office attending the event found that there were many big factors in why the meeting between all the countries ended with no agreements globally on any single of the issues brought forward. One pressing issue that angered the larger Developed Nations was the unwillingness of many developing countries to completely open their markets for free trade. Without this compromise, the United States and the European Nations felt no inclination to cut down Subsidies and help these developing countries economically without a fair agreement on trade. This was a hard standoff, as both sides of the argument wanted to increase global trade with a more open market, but neither was willing to settle for less than what they wanted.

Other large problems found by the Government Accountability Office included too much on the agenda for the amount of time they had, a lack of clear organization for the debates and lectures, and too many countries trying to participate while constantly realigning themselves solely to seek a better outcome for their countries. No one had the intentions to try and strike deals with each other as a whole, rather there were many back door deals throughout the conference as countries tried to swindle around everyone. Since 1986, the membership of this conference has risen by 90 participants to a total of 146 members. This has caused a large dilemma of satisfying all countries’ needs. As many of the earlier participants have already satisfied many of the open trade requirements in their countries, many of the newer countries are reluctant from abiding to the tariff abolition and free trade encouragement. One of the pressing reasons for this overwhelming movement was because this Cancun World Trade Organization conference was the first time the world had met since they had created the Doha Development Agenda. This agenda is designed to lower trading barriers and encourage a global trade on a much larger scale, with more of the smaller countries. With over two years since its creation, many countries had so many pressing issues they had hoped to bring forward into the conference, yet there was too little time for all of them to be considered. Many of them were also quite large ordeals, causing much unrest within the four-day conference.

References

See also
 Doha Development Round

2003 in Mexico
World Trade Organization ministerial conferences
Diplomatic conferences in Mexico
21st-century diplomatic conferences
2003 in international relations
Cancún
September 2003 events in Mexico